Jürg Studer (born c. 1957) is a Swiss curler.

At the national level, he is a 1983 Swiss men's and 1982 Swiss mixed champion curler.

Teams

Men's

Mixed

References

External links
 

Living people
Swiss male curlers
Swiss curling champions
1950s births
Place of birth missing (living people)